Narcisa Marizol Landázuri Benítez (born 13 June 1991) is an Ecuadorian sprinter. She competed in the 100 metres at the 2015 World Championships in Beijing without advancing from the first round. She competed at the 2020 Summer Olympics.

Competition record

Personal bests
100 metres – 11.12 (-1.2 m/s, Cochabamba 2018)
200 metres – 23.22 (-0.1 m/s, Quito 2017)

References

External links
 

1992 births
Living people
Ecuadorian female sprinters
World Athletics Championships athletes for Ecuador
Athletes (track and field) at the 2016 Summer Olympics
Olympic athletes of Ecuador
Athletes (track and field) at the 2018 South American Games
South American Games gold medalists for Ecuador
South American Games medalists in athletics
Athletes (track and field) at the 2015 Pan American Games
Pan American Games competitors for Ecuador
South American Games gold medalists in athletics
Athletes (track and field) at the 2020 Summer Olympics
Olympic female sprinters
Sportspeople from Esmeraldas, Ecuador
21st-century Ecuadorian women